Maritime province may refer to:

Maritimes, a region of Canada on the Atlantic coast
Maritime Province, another name for Primorsky Krai, Russia, sometimes used in English language texts